Bundaberg South is a suburb of Bundaberg in the Bundaberg Region, Queensland, Australia. In the  Bundaberg South had a population of 3,307 people.

History 
Bundaberg South State School opened on 6 February 1875. On 30 June 1885 it closed and split into two schools: Bundaberg South Boys State School and Bundaberg South Girls and Infants State School. Circa November 1894 both of these schools were renamed to be Bundaberg Central Boys State School and Bundaberg Central Girls and Infants State School. In 1926 the two schools were combined to create Bundaberg Central State School, which is now located in Bundaberg Central.

A second Bundaberg South State School opened on 11 May 1891.

St Mary's Mission Hall (Anglican Church) was dedicated in 26 March 1895. It closed during the year ended 31 December 1989.

Bundaberg State High School opened on 22 January 1912. In 1964 it was renamed Bundaberg State High School and Technical College. In 1965 the technical college was separated from the school and the school's name restored to Bundaberg State High School.

In the 2011 census, Bundaberg South had a population of 3,424 people.

In the  Bundaberg South had a population of 3,307 people.

Heritage listings 
Bundaberg South has a number of heritage-listed sites, including:
 30 George Street: St John's Lutheran Church
 37 Maryborough Street: Bundaberg State High School

Education
Bundaberg South State School is a government primary (Prep-6) school for boys and girls at Walla Street. In 2018, the school had an enrolment of 185 students with 15 teachers (11 full-time equivalent) and 13 non-teaching staff (8 full-time equivalent).

Bundaberg State High School is a government secondary (7-12) school for boys and girls at 37 Maryborough Street. In 2018, the school had an enrolment of 1,406 students with 117 teachers (111 full-time equivalent) and 68 non-teaching staff (53 full-time equivalent). It includes a special education program.

References

Suburbs of Bundaberg
Bundaberg Region